The 2008 Savannah State Tigers football team competed in college football on behalf of the Savannah State University.  The Tigers competed an independent as the NCAA Division I Football Championship Subdivision level.  This was the first season under the guidance of head coach Robby Wells.

The Tigers entered the 2008 season seeking its first winning season since joining Division I-AA in 2000, but compiled a 5–7 record. The season did mark the most wins since 1999, when the Tigers finished with a 5–6 as a member of the NCAA Division II. The Tigers last winning season was in 1998.

Schedule

Roster

Game summaries

Jacksonville University
Savannah State lost its season opener against Jacksonville, 20–7.  The Tigers put up 226 yards of total offense.  QB JaCorey Kilcrease was 4–18 with an interception and 28 yards passing. QB Kurvin Curry, who took over in the second half, was 6–9 for 73 yards and tossed a touchdown to Tyron Kirkland. Senior free safety Javorris Jackson made a game-high 10 tackles and intercepted a pass in the second quarter. Senior cornerback Marcus Darrisaw and sophomore linebacker Vince Cochran each recovered fumbles. Junior linebacker Willie Hall forced a fumble.

Eleven SSU players were declared ineligible to play because of NCAA Clearinghouse issues. Calvin Leonard and Frank Usher were both injured during the game. Leonard was the starter at middle linebacker while Leonard was the starter at weakside linebacker.

Livingstone College
Joe Turner Classic
Savannah State defeated Livingstone College 45–10, giving the team their first win of the season  and ending a 9-game losing streak dating back to last season. The win was the first for first year Head Coach Robbie Wells.

Savannah State had 29 first downs and 485 yards of total offense. The Tigers had 217 yards passing and 268 rushing. QB Kurvin Curry had a total of 326 yards with four touchdowns and was 10–23 passing for 217 yards and 2 touchdowns. He rushed for 109 yards and two scores. The Tigers first drive resulted in a 33-yard touchdown run by Curry. Justin Babb caught 3 passes for 114 yards and two touchdowns. He also rushed for 71 yards.

Jeff Robertson had 9 total tackles including a sack. Malik Allah recorded a sack and freshman Rashard Russell blocked a Livingstone punt and returned it for a touchdown in the 1st quarter.

Wide receiver Deleon Hollinger was reinstated prior to the game after being suspended for an undisclosed violation of team rules during the Tigers' season-opening loss. Hollinger was SSU's leading receiver during the 2007 season. Antonio Lenton, Quincy Watie, Thelmore Jackson, Keon Hayward, Patrick Thomas and Javares Taylor were cleared by the NCAA Clearinghouse to play in the game after missing the season opener.

Winston-Salem State University
Kurvin Curry threw for 154 yards and passed for two touchdowns to help Savannah State beat Winston-Salem State University. The victory was SSU's first over an NCAA Football Championship Subdivision team and first road win since 2004.

Bethune-Cookman University
Bethune-Cookman University ended the Tiger's two-game winning streak with a 34–9 victory. B-CU limited the Tigers to 43 yards rushing (24 carries) and 210 total yards on office. The Tigers scored just three points despite four trips to the red zone. SSU scored their only touchdown on a fumble recovery returned for a 33-yard touchdown by Willie Hall in the fourth quarter.  QB Kurvin Curry completed 11 of his 22 passes for 167 yards and had one interception. Bethune-Cookman has won nine straight against the Tigers.

Howard University
Miami Classic
Kurvin Curry threw for 126 yards (11-of-28 with a touchdown and an interception) and ran for 77 yards as the Tigers were defeated by Howard University in the 2008 Miami Classic.

Clark Atlanta University
Derek Williams made three field goals as Savannah State defeated Division II Clark Atlanta University, 17–14. QB Kurvin Curry threw for 220 yards and a 33-yard touchdown in the second quarter. He also ran for 81 yards as the Tigers improved to 3–3 on the season. Deleon Hollinger caught seven passes for 132 yards. Senior free safety Javorris Jackson made an interception and blocked a field goal attempt by Clark Atlanta in the fourth quarter.

The Tigers overcame an 11–0 lead by the Panthers to tie the game at 11–11 in the third quarter. Clark Atlanta regained a three points lead in the third quarter, but Williams made two field goals in the fourth quarter to seal the victory for the Tigers.

Charleston Southern University
Charleston Southern University committed five turnovers, but held off the Tigers for a 29–20 victory. SSU QB Kurvin Curry ran to CSU's 11-yard line in the fourth quarter, but fumbled the ball with 1 minute, 56 seconds remaining.

SSU kept the game close at several points. SSU running back Justin Babb, on second-and-goal from the CSU 1-yard line, was tackled for a 2-yard loss as time expired in the first half. That gave the Buccaneers a 26–14 halftime lead. Curry threw a touchdown pass to Deleon Hollinger with 13 minutes, 14 seconds to play and cut the score to 26–20, but kicker Luis Justiniano's missed extra point.

Curry was 17-of-29 passing (181 yards, 3 touchdowns, 2 interceptions and 2 sacks) and ran for 35 of SSU's 71 yards. Curry also threw a 15-yard touchdown to Isaiah Osborne in the first quarter. Hollinger had eight catches for 122 yards and 2 touchdowns.

The SSU defense intercepted three passes, the most since the Tigers intercepted three passes against South Carolina State University on Sept. 20, 2003. Sophomore cornerback Jamar Graham intercepted two of the three while cornerback Marcus Darrisaw and defensive end LaDarien Redfield each forced fumbles that were recovered by Redfield and defensive back Chris Asbury. Senior linebacker Calvin Leonard and junior linebacker Antwan Allen made 11 tackles each for the game high.

CSU moved to 3–3 on the season and improved to 5–0 all time against SSU . The Tigers fell to 3–4 as they lost their first game at home this season.

Mississippi Valley State University
Mississippi Valley State University's QB Paul Roberts threw a game-winning touchdown (one of three) with five seconds left in the game as the Delta Devils came from behind to beat Savannah State 22–20 and salvage their homecoming celebration.

The Delta Devils held a 9–3 lead at the end of the first quarter, but the Tigers went back on top, 13–9, at halftime. The Tigers took a 20–16 lead with 36 seconds to play in the fourth quarter before Mississippi Valley State scored the final touchdown for the victory.

SSU QB Kurvin Curry passed for 173 yards and one touchdown. He rushed for 79 yards.

The Delta Devils moved to 2–4 on the season while the Tigers fell to 3–5.

Concordia College
A 2008 Homecoming crowd of 9,217 at T.A. Wright Stadium watched as the Tigers overcame a 7–6 lead by Concordia College and a second quarter injury by starting quarterback Kurvin Curry for a 23–7 victory. This marked the first Homecoming game win for the Tigers since 2004 as SSU improved to 4–5 on the season.

Junior QB JaCorey Kilcrease, last season's starting quarterback, replaced Curry in the game, engineering four scoring drives, including 17 points in the fourth quarter. He completed 9-of-11 passes for 58 yards with no interceptions. The Tigers' offense committed no turnovers while the Tigers' defense intercepted three passes. Running back Justin Babb ran for 164 yards on 19 carries and freshman kicker Derek Williams made field goals of 27, 26 and 24 yards, and kicked two extra points.

Edward Waters College
Ralph Bunch Classic
Edward Waters College quarterback Kamau Leitner threw a 42-yard touchdown pass to wide receiver Jonathan Johnson over SSU's senior free safety Javorris Jackson, who slipped on the play, with 28 seconds left as the Tigers beat SSU, 26–21, before a crowd of 3,117 at Gilman Stadium in Kingsland, Georgia.

Edward Waters improved to 3–7 and won its second in a row versus SSU (Edward Waters spoiled SSU's Homecoming, 24–7 in 2007). SSU fell to 4–6 with two games remaining in the season.

Junior QB JaCorey Kilcrease completed 13-of-24 passes (131 yards, 1 touchdown and 2 interceptions) and freshman running back Rashard Russell ran for 106 yards on 14 carries.

Webber International University
The Tigers built a 14–0 halftime lead en route to a 24–7 victory over Webber International University. Freshman QB Kurvin Curry returned after injury and completed 10 of 22 passes for 194 yards, one touchdown, and one interception. The Warriors fell to 3–8 on the season while the Tigers improved to 5–6.

North Carolina Central University
The Tigers' effort to achieve its first non-losing season since 1998 fell short as the Tigers lost to
North Carolina Central, 10–7. In its first season under coach Robby Wells the team finished 5–7. The teams' last winning season was 1998 when they finished 7–4 as a member of the NCAA's Division II. The Tigers have failed to produce a winning season since joining the Football Championship Subdivision in 2002. Quarterback Kurvin Curry passed for 99 yards (8 of 18) and had one interception.

Awards and records

Awards
Freshman quarterback Kurvin Curry named Offensive Independent Player of the Week (September 16–22, 2008) by Black College Sports Page.
Senior free safety Javorris Jackson was selected to play in the eighth annual East Coast Bowl in Petersburg, Virginia. Jackson intercepted a pass as the South shutout the North, 27–0.
Deleon Hollinger was selected as the Coca-Cola Golden Helmet Offensive Player of the Year, Derek Williams was selected as the Special Teams Player of the Year, and Darren Hunter was selected as the Defensive Player of the Year for the 2008 football season.

Records

Statistics

Current as of  – All Games

Team

Scores by quarter

Individual Offense

Rushing

Passing

Receiving

Defense

Special teams

References

Savannah State
Savannah State Tigers football seasons
Savannah State Tigers football